The Gold Medal of the Institution of Structural Engineers is awarded by the Institution of Structural Engineers for exceptional and outstanding contributions to the advancement of structural engineering. It was established in 1922.

Recipients

See also

 List of engineering awards

References

IStructE Gold Medal winners
Structural engineering awards
British awards
Awards established in 1922